Northwestern Polytechnical University (NWPU) is a national key public research university in Xi'an, China. The university is funded by the Ministry of Industry and Information Technology. 

The university is a Chinese national Class A Double First Class University. It is also a member of the former Project 985 and Project 211.

NPU specializes in education and research in the fields of aeronautical, astronautical and marine engineering. As of 2012, NPU had 13,736 graduate students (3,063 full-time doctorate candidates, 7,087 master candidates, 3,586 professional degree candidates) and 14,395 undergraduate students.

As of 2021, Northwestern Polytechnical University was listed as one of the top 450 universities in both the Academic Ranking of World Universities and the U.S. News & World Report Best Global University Ranking.

History

NPU builds upon the legacies of its three major predecessors.

Northwestern Engineering Institute
In 1938, due to the Japanese invasion of China, many universities in the occupied east evacuated to "Free China" in the western hinterland. Among those that fled to Shaanxi, the National Beiyang Engineering Institute, the Engineering School of Beiping University, the Engineering School of the National Northeastern University, and the (private) Jiaozuo Engineering Institute were combined to form the National Northwestern Engineering Institute in Hanzhong, a city surrounded by mountains. In 1946, after the surrender of Japan, Northwestern Engineering Institute was relocated to the city of Xianyang.

East China Aeronautics Institute
In 1952, to meet the demand for concentrated aeronautics research, the departments of aeronautical engineering of the former National Central University (later known as Nanjing University), Jiaotong University and Zhejiang University were relocated to Nanjing and combined to form the East China Aeronautics Institute. This institute was relocated to Xi'an and renamed the Xi'an Aeronautics Institute, which is the second predecessor of the NPU, in 1956.

In 1957, the Northwestern Engineering Institute and the Xi'an Aeronautics Institute were merged to form NPU, which concentrated its research efforts on defense technology for aeronautics, astronautics and marine engineering.

People's Liberation Army Military Engineering Institute
In 1970, due to deteriorating relations with the former USSR, the People's Liberation Army Military Engineering Institute, which was located in Harbin, was disassembled. Many of its departments were relocated from the city near the China-Soviet border; among these, its Department of Aeronautical Engineering (the third predecessor of NPU) was moved to Xi'an and merged with the other two predecessors to form NPU.

Campuses
NPU's campuses comprise about 4.58 km2, with the Youyi Campus, located in Beilin District, Xi'an, comprising about 0.8 km2 and the Chang'an Campus, located in Chang'an District, Xi'an, comprising about 2.6 km2. and the Taicang Campus, located in Suzhou, Jiangsu, comprising about 1.18 km2.

Youyi Campus
The Youyi Campus, often referred as the 'old campus', is divided into three parts: the South, the West and the North by the West Youyi Road and the South Laodong Road. The campus contains education facilities, apartments of teachers and students, stadiums, logistics facilities, a kindergarten and the primary and middle school affiliated with NPU.

Chang'an Campus
The Chang'an Campus, often referred as the 'new campus', is divided into two parts: the East and the West by the Dongxiang Road. This campus contains many newly built administration buildings, school buildings, experiments facilities, sports facilities and so on. It serves as the main base for undergraduate education of NPU.

Taicang Campus
The Taicang Campus，located at the border between Suzhou and Shanghai，is currently under construction and will start to run in September 2021. This campus will contain 10 schools including School of Artificial Intelligence, School of Flexible Electronics, School of Business etc. It will serve around 10,000 students.

Infrastructure development
NPU is building or going to build more facilities on both of these two campuses.  Supported by the Ministry of Industry and Information Technology and the former Commission for Science, Technology and Industry for National Defense, NPU has received a 1.58 billion CNY (US$252.8 million) investment in infrastructure constructions from the central government and there're more than 20 construction projects running currently including the Material Science Building, the Innovation Science and Technology Building, the Reconstruction of Dangerous and Old Apartments after the earthquake, the #1 Student Apartment in the Youyi Campus and the New Library, Infrastructure Plan I & II, the High-tech Experimental Research Center and others in the Chang'an Campus.

Academics
NPU has a strong research capacity in engineering. It was confirmed as one of the National Key Universities by the State Council in 1960. In the seventh and eighth Five-year plan, NPU was listed as one of the 15 National Key Developing Universities. In the ninth Five-year plan, NPU joined the Project 211. And, in the tenth Five-year plan, NPU joined the Project 985.

Since its establishment, NPU has educated more than 150,000 high level technicians and researchers for China's defense industry and national economy development. The first PhD from 6 disciplines in China was graduated from NPU. And, among NPU's alumni, there are more than 30 fellows of the CAS and the CAE, 30 generals in PLA and 6 recipients of China's TOP 10 Outstanding Youth Elite.

Accreditation and memberships 
NPU is one of the Seven Sons of National Defence and member of SAP University Alliances.

Funding
The university's research funding has been continually rising every year. It reached 1.67 billion RMB in 2010 (US$0.26 billion), ranking fifth among all universities in China with funding per faculty member ranked first. And, in 2011, it reached 1.91 billion RMB.

Rankings and reputation 
As of 2021, Northwestern Polytechnical University was listed as one of the world's top 450th universities in both the Academic Ranking of World Universities and the U.S. News & World Report Best Global University Ranking.

As of 2022, NPU ranked 25th in the Best Chinese Universities Ranking compiled by Shanghai Ruanke. And, NPU's engineering ranked the tenth among China's engineering universities.

According to the results of the third Evaluation of Disciplines by the Ministry of Education of the People's Republic of China, the ranks of parts of NPU's disciplines are shown below.

Laboratories
The university has seven State Key Laboratories and 28 Province/Ministry-level Key Laboratories. Only the State Key Laboratories are listed below. These labs often specialize in particular areas of academic research and receive government funding:
Materials science
Chemistry
Mathematics and Physics
Geography
Biotechnology
Information technology
Engineering
Medicine

Organization

Education Experimental School
The Education Experimental School is the college with special honors in NPU. Its predecessor is the Education Reform Class established in 1985 which was upgraded to the current school in 2001. The aim of this school is to provide the most elite students of NPU with the best resources so that they can become future leaders in their fields.

Academic schools
NPU has 15 academic schools, 1 educational experimental school( known as Honors College), 1 independent school and some other administrative schools. The university offers 58 undergraduate programs, 117 master programs, 67 doctorate programs and 14 postdoctoral programs. Currently, there are 2 First-level National Key Disciplines, 7 Second-level National Key Disciplines, 2 National Key (to cultivate) Disciplines, 21 First-level Disciplines for Doctorate Degree Granting and 31 First-level Disciplines for master's degree Granting. Additionally, NPU has 7 State Key Laboratories, 28 Province/Ministry-level Key Laboratories and 19 Province/Ministry-level Engineering Research Centers. 
The 15 academic schools of NPU are listed here in the official order.

School of Aeronautics
School of Astronautics
School of Marine Science and Technology
School of Materials Science and Engineering
School of Mechanical Engineering
School of Mechanics, Civil Engineering and Architecture
School of Power and Energy
School of Electronics and Information
School of Automation
School of Computer Science and Technology
School of Science
School of Management
School of Humanities, Economics and Law
School of Software and Microelectronics
School of Life Science
School of Foreign Languages

Other schools
Besides the 15 major academic schools and the education experimental school, NPU has other schools or institutes. They are:
 Engineering Practice Exercise Center
 Physical Education Department
 Continuing Education School
 Internet Education School
 International College
 National Secrecy School
 Mingde College (independent)

Student life

Innovation Study Base
The Innovation Study Base, directed by the Dean's Office of NPU, consists of multiple student competition programs including NPU's university team of Football Robotics, Dancing Robotics, Model United Nations, Mathematical Modeling, Model Airplanes and so on. In the 11th Five-year plan, NPU students won more than 1,400 awards at the international, state and provincial levels including 54 first or second place international level award and 147 first or second national level award.

Student Club Center
The Student Club Center, directed by the Communist Youth League of NPU, serves all university-level student clubs. The center helps to organize and supervise student activities on the campus and acts like a bridge between the administration and students' clubs.

Affiliated secondary school

Notable alumni

 Wu Yi – Former Vice Premier of the State Council of the People's Republic of China
 Hao Peng – Party Committee Secretary of the State-owned Assets Supervision and Administration Commission (SASAC); former Governor of Qinghai province
 Zhang Qingwei – Communist Party Secretary of Heilongjiang province; former Governor of Hebei province
 Yang Wei – president of Zhejiang University, aircraft designer in 611
 Yuan-Cheng Fung – graduate from department of Engineering of National Central University (Nanjing University, Present), which is one of the predecessors of Northwestern Polytechnical University
 Jasen Wang - Founder and CEO of Makeblock

Notable faculty members 
 Hu Peiquan, Founder of the Department of Engineering Mechanics and the Journal of Northwestern Polytechnical University
 Chuah Hean Teik, Consultant Professor to Northwestern Polytechnical University and Former President cum CEO of Universiti Tunku Abdul Rahman

References

External links
 Official website 
 Official website 
 Non-Official Communities of Northwestern Polytechnical University

 
Project 211
Project 985
Vice-ministerial universities in China
1938 establishments in China
Educational institutions established in 1938